Maurice Dailey "Toby" Atwell (March 8, 1924 – January 25, 2003) was an American professional baseball player who was a catcher in Major League Baseball for the Chicago Cubs (–), Pittsburgh Pirates (–) and Milwaukee Braves. He was born in Leesburg, Virginia, and served in the United States military during World War II.

Career
Atwell's baseball career started in the Brooklyn Dodgers' organization in 1946. A strong defensive catcher, he shortened his career when he hurt his knee sliding while playing for the Triple-A Montreal Royals during the  International League season. His most productive campaign came in his rookie year with the 1952 Cubs, when he posted career-highs in batting average (.290), RBI (31), runs (36), hits (105), doubles (16), games played (107), and was selected to the National League All-Star team. In  he was part of a ten-player, early-June trade that saw the Cubs acquire Baseball Hall of Fame slugger Ralph Kiner from the Pittsburgh Pirates.

In his five-year major league career, Atwell was a .260 hitter with nine home runs and 110 RBI in 378 games. His 290 career hits also included 41 doubles and seven triples.

Atwell's last year as a player in pro ball was 1958. He died in Purcellville, Virginia, at the age of 78.

References

External links

Toby Atwell Baseballbiography.com
Encyclopedia of Baseball Catchers

1924 births
2003 deaths
Baseball players from Virginia
Chicago Cubs players
Danville Dodgers players
Fort Worth Cats players
Louisville Colonels (minor league) players
Major League Baseball catchers
Miami Marlins (IL) players
Milwaukee Braves players
Montreal Royals players
National League All-Stars
Omaha Cardinals players
People from Leesburg, Virginia
Pittsburgh Pirates players
St. Paul Saints (AA) players
Vancouver Mounties players
Virginia Tech Hokies baseball players
Wichita Braves players
American military personnel of World War II